Queen Dowager Xuan of Qin (338(?)–265 BC), also known as Mi Bazi (羋八子), was the first queen dowager in Chinese history. A concubine of King Huiwen of Qin and the mother of King Zhaoxiang of Qin, Queen Dowager Xuan acted as regent for her son 307-305 and held de facto power in Qin for 35 years during the Warring States period.   She was one of the first women confirmed to have acted as regent in China and one of the most politically influential women noted since Lady Nanzi.

Early life 
Queen Dowager Xuan was a native of the State of Chu. Her ancestral name is Mi, the same as the royal house of Chu. She held the rank 'bazi'  in King Huiwen's harem, so she was also called Mi Bazi. In 325 BC, Mi Bazi gave birth to Prince Ji. She had two other sons with King Huiwen. 

King Huiwen died in 311 BC, succeeded by his son King Wu of Qin. King Wu suffered an accident and died without issue in 307 BC. With support from King Wuling of Zhao and Wei Ran, Mi Bazi's son, Prince Ji claimed the Qin throne as King Zhaoxiang. Mi Bazi became Queen Dowager Xuan and regent for King Zhaoxiang (who hadn't come of age), with assistance from Wei Ran.

Queen dowager
Queen Dowager Xuan bestowed titles to her half brothers Wei Ran and Mi Rong, as well as her two other sons . These four, collectively known as  "Four Nobles" would hold power over Qin for years. 

Queen Dowager Xuan represented Qin's interests and protected and expanded Qin's realm. However, she refused to fight her homeland Chu when the state of Han, under the attack of Chu, asked Qin for reinforcement.

She entered illicit relations with the "barbarian" Yiqu king and had two sons with him, but later tricked and killed him. Following that coup, the Qin army marched into Yiqu territory at the queen dowager's orders; the Qin annihilated Yiqu and thus came to possess the Ordos region. Yiqu's fall rendered Qin a safe northern border. Since there was no more hostile forces in the north of Qin, Yiqu's fall ensured Qin's successful expansion eastward.

Downfall and death 
In 271 BC, Fan Ju warned King Zhaoxiang that the power controlled by the Queen Dowager and the "Four Nobles" threatened the king's rule. King Zhaoxiang then stripped Queen Dowager Xuan of her power, exiled the "Four Nobles" from the capital, and appointed Fan Ju to be Chancellor of Qin in place of Wei Ran. Queen Dowager Xuan died in 265 BC and was buried at Mount Li.

In fiction and popular culture
 Portrayed by Ning Jing in The Qin Empire II: Alliance (2012) and The Qin Empire III (2017)
 Portrayed by Sun Li in The Legend of Mi Yue (2015)

References 

330s BC births
265 BC deaths
Rulers of Qin
Women leaders of China
3rd-century BC women rulers
4th-century BC women rulers
Chu state people
4th-century BC Chinese people
4th-century BC Chinese women
Qin royal consorts